Murshidabad University is a public state university in Berhampore, Murshidabad, West Bengal. The university was established in 2021 by the West Bengal government under The Murshidabad University Act, 2018.

History

The institution was established in 1853 as Krishnath College as a liberal arts and sciences college in Baharampur. In 1998, Krishnath College became an affiliate of the University of Kalyani. Prior to this, they were an affiliate to University of Calcutta. In July 2018, the Murshidabad University Bill, which was passed by the house will enable  a state-aided university in Murshidabad to be established by upgrading the existing Krishnath College. In February 2021, the principal of this college is appointed as vice-chancellor of Murshidabad University by Department of Higher Education, Govt. of West Bengal.

The college was established in 1853 by Maharani Swarnamoyee Devi. The college was named for her husband, Maharaja Krishnath Roy of Cossimbazar. In 1841, Maharaja Krishnath received his zamindary (a jurisdiction assigned to a zamindar) and had the dream of establishing an academic institution. Following her husband's death, Swarnamoyee gave as a gift both land and money, saving the college from financial crisis. Mr. Harrison became the first principal of the college. The famous Indian Scholar and writer Brajendra Nath Seal developed the infrastructure of the college.

Courses offered
 Santali Hons
 LLM
 MA Arabic
 MA Bengali
 MA English
 MA Sanskrit
 MA Education
 MA History
 MA Geography
 MA Political Science
 MA Philosophy
 Msc Botany
 Msc Physiology
 Msc Physics
 Msc Sericulture
 Msc Mathemetics

Accreditation
In 2016 Krishnath College was awarded an 'A' grade by the National Assessment and Accreditation Council (NAAC). The college is recognized by the University Grants Commission (India) (UGC). It is built on the structure of Oxford University.

Notable alumni

Krishnath College

Surya Sen – Indian freedom fighter
Ritwik Ghatak – filmmaker and script writer
Babar Ali (teacher) – Youngest headmaster in the world by BBC in October 2009, at the age of sixteen
Sudip Bandyopadhyay – M.P.
Abul Barkat-Bhasa Saheed (1952, Dhaka)
Benimadhab Barua – Indian Bengali Scholar, first Asian D.Litt.
P. C. Bose – Independence activist and politician
Tridib Chaudhuri – Nationalist politician and  freedom fighter
Atulkrishna Ghosh – Indian freedom fighter
Moinul Hassan – A member of Rajya Sabha and a Communist politician
Nalinaksha Sanyal – Politician, Economist
Amarendra Nath Sen – Chief Justice of the Calcutta High Court

Gallery

See also
List of institutions of higher education in West Bengal
 List of universities in West Bengal
 Education in India
 Education in West Bengal

References

External links
Murshidabad University Act 2018
Official Website
Facebook Page
University of Kalyani
University Grants Commission
National Assessment and Accreditation Council

Universities and colleges in Murshidabad district
Universities and colleges in West Bengal
Educational institutions established in 2020
Murshidabad district
2020 establishments in West Bengal